AGMA is a Moroccan insurance company specialising in life insurance and asset management.

History and profile
Agma Lahlou-Tazi was established in January 1964. It is part of Mohammed VI's holding company SNI. The company was listed on Casablanca Stock Exchange in November 1998 and is based in Casablanca.

Key people
Key people of the company are as follows:
Mohamed Lahlou, Chairman of the Board and Managing Director
Hassan Benchekroun, Finance Director
Mohamed Doubiany, Director of Accountancy
A. Gabli, Director of Information Solutions (Systems)
A. Nougaoui, Director of Development, Organization and Communication
Abdelhay El Ouarzazi, Director of Human Resources, Foreign Claims
T. Awad, Director of Transport and Health Insurance
Nadia Bakkali, Assistant of Chairman of the Board and Managing Director
A. Benkiran, Director of Property Damage Insurance
N. Chekri, Director of Casualty Claims Insurance
Abdelaziz Cherrad, Director of Premiums Collection
Mostafa Hannaoui, Director of Individuals Insurance
Abdellatif Yacoubi, Director of Auto and Casualty Insurance
Daniel Antunes, Director
Philippe Carle, Director
Khalid El Bouri, Director
Mounir Majidi, Representative of Siger on the Board
Bassim Jai Hokimi, Director
Guy Motais de Narbonne, Representative of Ona Courtage on the Board
Nelly Rabane, Representative of Societe Financiere de Gestion et de Placement on the Board.

Ownership
The company is owned by the following entities, as of 2013:
ONA Courtage (SNI) 50%
Others 27%
PATRIMOINE GESTION ET PLACEMENTS 16,07%
CAISSE MAROCAINE DE RETRAITE (CMR) 6,39%
WAFA ASSURANCE 0,35%
MCMA 0,14%

References

External links
Official website - courtier assurances agma

1964 establishments in Morocco
Financial  services companies established in 1964
Insurance companies of Morocco
Société Nationale d'Investissement
Companies based in Casablanca